The Dassault Falcon 7X is a large-cabin,  range business jet manufactured by Dassault Aviation, the second largest of its Dassault Falcon line. Launched at 2001 Paris Air Show, its first flight was on 5 May 2005 and it entered service on 15 June 2007. The Falcon 8X is derived from the 7X with a longer range of  afforded by engine optimizing, aerodynamic refinements and an increase in fuel capacity. Featuring an S-duct central engine, it and the Falcon 900 are the only two trijets in production.

Falcon 7X

Development 

Dassault launched the FNX at the 2001 Paris Air Show, aiming for a 10,500km (5,700nm) range at Mach 0.88, up from the Falcon 900EX's 8,300 km at Mach 0.84. Its new high-speed wing is  longer with 5° higher wing sweep than the 900 wing; while its fuselage is 20% longer, it keeps the same cabin cross-section but with a new curved windscreen. The trijet has a combined thrust of 18,000lb (80kN)  provided by Honeywell FX5s, a new design, or a Pratt & Whitney Canada PW306 growth version. Based on Honeywell Primus Epic avionics, its EASy cockpit is developed for the Falcon 2000EX and 900EX and controls are fly-by-wire. Scheduled to fly in 2004, first deliveries were planned for mid-2006.

With 41 deposits, it was named 7X in November with first flight slipping from late 2004 to early 2005 and certification planned for mid-2006. With a simplified structure to reduce cost and weight, the optimised high-transonic wing improves the lift-to-drag ratio by 10% over the supercritical wing of the Falcon 50 shared by previous Falcons. The cabin is 2.4m (8ft) longer than the 900 and has a lower 6,000ft (1,800m) cabin altitude. the  PW307A was finally selected, among other risk-sharing partners: Honeywell for avionics architecture, auxiliary power unit, air management system; with Parker Hannifin for the power generation system and wheels brakes; and TRW Aeronautical Systems for the hydromechanical flap and airbrake systems.

With over 50 firm orders, it completed its first flight on 5 May 2005, flying for 1h 36min from Bordeaux-Merignac, starting a 1,200h flight test programme over 15 month: it climbed to 10,000 ft (3,000 m) for hydraulic, fuel, air data and landing gear extraction/retraction systems tests, then climbed to 25,000 ft for acceleration/deceleration tests and basic autopilot and autothrottle operations. The second Falcon 7X was planned to join in June of that year, and the third with a full interior in September that year for long-range, endurance tests and interior sound level validation: Dassault aims for a 52dB sound level in the cabin, 4dB lower than other Falcons. Certification slipped to late 2006 and  first deliveries to early 2007.

It was first presented to the public at the 2005 Paris Air Show. The aircraft has received its type certification from both the Federal Aviation Administration and European Aviation Safety Agency (EASA) on 27 April 2007. The first 7X, MSN05, entered service on 15 June 2007. The hundredth was delivered in November 2010.

Price 

In 2001, the Falcon 7X, at approximately $35 million (preproduction order price), was nearly $10 million cheaper than its nearest competitors in the long-range, large cabin market segment, including the Gulfstream G550 and Bombardier Global Express. It was targeted to be priced for 2004 at 12% more than the $33 million top-of-the-range Falcon 900EX equipped: $ million. Its price was $37 million in 2005, and $41 million in 2007.
In 2017, its list price was $54M, a 3-4-year-old 7X was worth $27-34m and a 7-9 year old one cost $19-24M. The latest market data for Q1 2020 shows 287 out of 289 aircraft currently in operation with an asking price range of $18,495,000 - $24,800,000.
In 2022, its equipped price was $53.8M.

Design

The Falcon 7X is a three-engined cantilever monoplane with a low-positioned, highly swept wing. It has a horizontal stabiliser at mid-height and a retractable tricycle landing gear, and three rear-mounted Pratt & Whitney PW307A turbofan engines : two on the side of the fuselage and one in a center position, and room for 19 passengers and 3 crew. It is the first production Falcon jet with winglets.

It is the first fully fly-by-wire business jet and is equipped with the same avionics suite, the Honeywell Primus Epic "Enhanced Avionics System" (EASy), that was used on the Falcon 900EX and later on the Falcon 2000EX.

The Falcon 7X is notable for its extensive use of computer-aided design, the manufacturer claiming it to be the "first aircraft to be designed entirely on a virtual platform", using Dassault Systemes' CATIA and PLM products.

In February 2010, Dassault Falcon and BMW Designworks were awarded the 2009 Good Design Award by the Chicago Athenaeum and the European Centre for Architecture Art Design for their collaboration on the new Falcon 7X interior option.
Due to special engine mounts and cabin isolators, the cabin is extremely quiet, below 50 dBA, and is available with a shower.

Pitch trim incident

EASA grounded the Falcon 7X fleet after a report from Dassault Aviation regarding an uncontrolled pitch trim runaway during descent in one of its jets in May 2011. The aircraft pitched up to 41 degrees, with the load factor increasing to 4.6g, it climbed from 13,000 to 22,500 ft and the airspeed went from 300 to 125 kn.

"This condition, if occurring again, could lead to loss of control of the aeroplane," the EASA notice said. Initial results of investigation showed that there was a production defect in the Horizontal Stabilizer Electronic Control Unit which could have contributed to the cause of the event. Dassault Aviation developed modifications in June 2011 to allow a return to flight.

After four years of investigation, the Bureau d'Enquêtes et d'Analyses pour la Sécurité de l'Aviation Civile published its final report in June 2016. It was found that incorrect nose-up commands to the trimmable horizontal stabilizer were caused by a soldering defect on the pin of its electronic control unit provided by Rockwell Collins.

Teterboro-London City record

On May 2, 2014, Dassault Falcon pilots Philippe Deleume and Olivier Froment set a new speed record for the Falcon 7X on a 5 h 54 min flight from New York Teterboro Airport to London City Airport with three passengers on board.

Falcon 8X

The 6,450 nmi (11,945 km) range Falcon 8X was announced at the European Business Aviation Convention & Exhibition in May 2014. Its cabin is  longer than the 7X. With improvements to wing design and improved Pratt & Whitney Canada PW300, the 8X is up to 35% more fuel efficient than its competitors.

The prototype, registered F-WWQA, first flew from Bordeaux–Mérignac Airport on 6 February 2015. The Falcon 8X was added as a subtype of the Falcon 7X on the EASA type certificate on 24 June 2016 as modification M1000 for S/N 0401 and ongoing. Dassault delivered the first Falcon 8X on 5 October 2016 to Greek business aviation operator Amjet Executive.

The three PW307D turbofans gained  each, and are 1.5% more fuel efficient.
The wing structure is  lighter, and more flexible for comfort, while operating empty weight is  heavier than the 7X despite the  stretch.
A strict weight control allows most operators to match or best Dassault's  estimate BOWs for a fully equipped aircraft with three crewmembers.
Its unmatched structural efficiency, with a OEW only half of MTOW, allow a superior fuel efficiency while its MTOW is less than a  Gulfstream IV-SP.
The 47 db average cabin sound level is 2-3 db lower than the Falcon 7X.
In 2022, its equipped price was $62.5M.

Operators

Civil operators

More than 260 Falcon 7X have been delivered between mid-2007 to March 2016 and the type has flown more than 440,000 hours. Europe has 117 aircraft, 45% of the fleet: 18 in Switzerland, 13 in France, eight in Luxembourg, seven in Belgium, Denmark, Germany and Portugal, six in Russia, four in Ukraine among others. Antwerp's Flying Group operates five aircraft, Shell Oil has four in Rotterdam and Dassault Falcon Service at Paris-Le Bourget manages four, as does Volkswagen AG in Wolfsburg. 20% of the fleet is in North America: more than 50 in the U.S., six in Canada and five in Mexico. In Asia-Pacific, 14 are in Hong Kong and 11 in China among others. Planet Nine Private Air LLC, a premium ultra long range charter based in Los Angeles, operates five Falcon 7X. Jet charter and management company Clay Lacy Aviation operates Falcon 7x aircraft on both U.S. coasts.  

Corporate and charter operators use their Falcon 8Xs 600 to 850 hours per year, while individual operators fly theirs 300 to 400 hours per year.
Air Alsie in Denmark operates five Falcon 8Xs and six Falcon 7Xs, five 8Xs are based in Switzerland while Volkswagen, Global Jet Luxembourg and ExecuJet Europe each fly two 8Xs.
Other operators have a single 8X: Shell, Flying Group, Aviaservice Air in Kazan, Russia, NetJets Europe, TAG Aviation in Geneva, Switzerland, Abelag Aviation and the Egyptian Air Force.
Six are based in the US including with Bechtel, Citrus Products, Energy Transfer Partners, Honeywell, Sony. 
Three are based in China, two in São Paulo, and others are registered in San Marino, Malta and Monaco, throughout the Mediterranean, Middle East and India.

Government and military operators

 Royal Australian Air Force : three Falcon 7X leased for VVIP missions.

 Belgian Air Force: 2x Falcon 7X in military service (OO-LUM & OO-FAE) dry leased from Luxaviation (former Abelag Aviation).

 Ecuadorian Air Force : One Falcon 7X (ID: FAE 052) for long-distance travel along the presidential Embraer Legacy 600. Delivered November 4, 2013; first official trip November 25, 2013.
 
 Egyptian Air Force - four Falcon 7X Order

 French Air and Space Force
 Escadron de transport, d'entrainement et de calibration 60 (government members air transport) : 2 Falcon 7X. Being used primarily by then-president Nicolas Sarkozy, the first shipped airplane was nicknamed "Carla One" by French newspapers, in reference to Carla Bruni, then French First Lady.
 Two Falcon 8X ARCHANGE (Avion de renseignement à charge utile de nouvelle genération) SIGINT aircraft on order to replace France's Transall C-160 Gabriel SIGINT aircraft.

 Hellenic Air Force - One Falcon 7X

 Hungarian Air Force : Two Falcon 7X (HuAF606) (HuAF653) 

 Indonesian Air Force: One Falcon 7X and one Falcon 8X interim planes for familiarization and training, stationed in 17th air squadron for VVIP transport. Order for two Falcon 8X to be delivered in stages within one year timeframe, part of first batch Indonesian Air Force's Dassault Rafale contract. 

 Albert II, Prince of Monaco - one Falcon 7X since 2013.

 Namibia - government : one Falcon 7X
 
 Nigerian Air Force - Two Falcon 7X

 Two such aircraft (with registration numbers RA-09007, RA-09009) use the Russian special flight squad based on the state-owned Rossiya Airlines to transport the highest officials of the state.

Specifications

See also

References

External links

 
 
 
 
 
 
 
 
 

Falcon 000
2000s French business aircraft
2010s French business aircraft
Low-wing aircraft
Trijets
Cruciform tail aircraft
Aircraft first flown in 2005